Tulsa Ballet is a professional American ballet company located in Tulsa, Oklahoma. The artistic mission of Tulsa Ballet is "To preserve the tradition of classical ballet, promote the appreciation of contemporary dance, create works of superior and enduring quality, and educate through exemplary performances, training and outreach programs." The Company has toured throughout the United States and the world and has received consistent critical acclaim.

History
The company was founded in 1956 by musician Rosalie Talbot and married couple Roman Jasinski and Moscelyne Larkin. Jasinski and Larkin were famous dancers who were internationally known for their style in the grand Ballets Russes tradition. Under their leadership, the troupe rose to the top echelon in the National Association for Regional Ballet in 1973 and became a fully professional company in 1978. After a successful engagement at the Brooklyn Center for the Performing Arts at Brooklyn College in 1983, a 1986 West Coast tour, and a return to BCBC in 1988 to perform George Balanchine's reconstructed Mozart's Violin Concerto, the company was hailed as one of Oklahoma's valuable arts organizations.

In 1990 Roman Larkin Jasinski was appointed to succeed his parents as artistic director of the company. Unfortunately, the company did not thrive under his leadership and at the end of Jasinski's third season, the company began imploding as major conflicts among board members, dancers and the management came to a head. In November 1994, Jasinski tendered his resignation and left the company in chaos.

Artistic director
Renowned Italian dancer Marcello Angelini was appointed Artistic Director of the Tulsa Ballet in 1995. According to Dance Magazine, Angelini managed to solve the internal conflicts within the company and raise the artistic achievements of the company simultaneously. He unified the board members, working well with artistic director emerita Larkin, and establishing friendly relationships with his predecessors. "His gracious yet fierce tenacity, tough professional reputation, and superior negotiating skills soon earned him the nickname 'The Italian Tornado'."

Dance Magazine credits Angelini with building a strong and highly versatile company that is able to tackle both classical and contemporary works by well-known choreographers. The Italian-born, Kiev Institute-trained director is said to expect dancers to achieve a technical level and artistic range comparable to that of the major companies he danced with (Deutsche Oper Berlin, Les Grands Ballets Canadiens, Cincinnati Ballet, Ballet West). He is also credited with stating that "to grow a company, you have to stretch the dancer one way, then the other".

Productions
Tulsa ballet creates five productions annually in addition to The Nutcracker and reaches an audience of over 48,000 individuals every season. Under Angelini's leadership, the company has undertaken an ambitious repertory building program. For the past eleven years, Tulsa Ballet has added more than 60 new works to its repertory, many of which have been either American Premieres or World Premieres. Many of the world's best choreographers have worked with Tulsa Ballet including: Leonide Massine, Antony Tudor, Jerome Robbins, George Balanchine, Paul Taylor, Kurt Jooss, John Butler, Nacho Duato (ten works), Val Caniparoli who is its resident choreographer (with seven works and four world premieres), Stanton Welch, Luciano Cannito, Young Soon Hue, Ma Cong, Lila York, Twyla Tharp and many others.

In its first international tour in 2002, Tulsa Ballet was declared by the Portuguese national magazine Semanario “One of the best in the world.” The company has received two feature articles in Dance Magazine during the past seven years, has been featured in the New York Times, Pointe Magazine and Dance Europe among others.  In March 2008, Tulsa Ballet was featured on the cover of Pointe magazine- a distinction given to only one ballet company each year.  In April 2008, Tulsa Ballet completed an ambitious $17.3 million integrated campaign, which was celebrated at the opening of the brand new Studio K; an on-site, three hundred-seat performance space dedicated to the creation of new works.

Dance company
Dancers for the 2016-2017 season include:

Principals

 Hyonjun Rhee 
 Youhee Son 
 Madalina Stoica 
 Arman Zazyan

Senior Soloists

 Jonnathan Ramirez

Soloists

 Cavan Conley  
 Diana Gomez 
 Rodrigo Hermesmeyer

Demi-Soloists

 Andres Figueroa 
 Gabriela Gonzalez 
 Jennifer Grace 
 Daynelis Muñoz Castell 

 Joshua Stayton
 Chong Sun

Corps de Ballet

 Jaimi Cullen 
 Andrew Fassbender 
 Maine Kawashima 
 Julie Marquet 
 Andres Figueroa 
 Matteo Manzoni 
 Regina Montgomery 
 Chandler Proctor 
 Minori Sakita 
 João Sampaio 
 Daniel van de Laar 
 Shuhei Yoshida 
 Shion Yuasa

Apprentice

 Jessica Payne

Former dancers
Former dancers with the Tulsa Ballet include:

Former principals

 Karina Gonzalez (2005-2010)

 Ryan Martin (2000-2001)

Former soloists

 Ashley Blade-Martin (1999-2011) 

 Michael Eaton (2005-2008) 

 Kate Oderkirk (2006-2011) 

 René Olivier (1999-2009)

Former demi-soloists
*Ashley Dangos (2002-2006)
 Serena Chu (1999-2010) 

 Ke Da (2007-2010) 

 Jennifer DeWolfe (2000-2008) 

 Rupert Edwards (2004-2010) 

 Ricardo Graziano (2005-2010) 

 Maria Victoria Ignomiriello (2006-2007) 

 Mugen Kazama (2007-2010) 

 Megan Keough (2002-2010) 

 Deng Mi (2007-2009)

Former corps de ballet

 Florent Bouyat (2010-2011) 
 Kiri Chapman (2006-2008) 

 Leah Gallas (2006-2010) 

 Alex Harrison (2010-2011) 
 Ilan Kav (2007-2008) 

 Balázs Krajczár (2008-2009) 

 Gabriella Limatola (2007-2008) 

 Nathan McGinnis (2001-2011) 

 Elise Miller (2010-2011) 
 Masahiro Momose (2007-2009) 

 Mikhail Ovcharov (2007-2010) 

 Gwénaëlle Poline (2010-2011) 
 Daiva Preston (2007-2008) 

 Kirk Robison (2006-2007) 

 Susanna Salvi (2010-2011) 

 Avichai Scher (2007-2008) 

 Francesco Sorrentino (2007-2008) 

 Laura Suttle (2010-2011) 
 Joshua Trader (2002-2010) 

 Marit van der Wolde (2004-2010) 

 Iseda Yuki (2008-2009) 

 Zhang Kai (2008-2009)

References

External links
 

Ballet companies in the United States
Dance in Oklahoma
Non-profit organizations based in Oklahoma
Arts organizations based in Oklahoma
Culture of Tulsa, Oklahoma
Economy of Tulsa, Oklahoma
Tourist attractions in Tulsa, Oklahoma
Performing groups established in 1956
1956 establishments in Oklahoma